Sherman Township is the name of a number of places in the U.S. state of Iowa:
 Sherman Township, Calhoun County, Iowa
 Sherman Township, Hardin County, Iowa
 Sherman Township, Jasper County, Iowa
 Sherman Township, Kossuth County, Iowa
 Sherman Township, Monona County, Iowa, Monona County, Iowa
 Sherman Township, Montgomery County, Iowa
 Sherman Township, Pocahontas County, Iowa
 Sherman Township, Sioux County, Iowa, Sioux County, Iowa
 Sherman Township, Story County, Iowa

See also
 Sherman Township (disambiguation)

Iowa township disambiguation pages